Robert Warley Wilson (born 15 July 1934) is a former first-class cricketer who played for Oxford University in 1956 and 1957.

Robert Wilson was educated at Warwick School before going up to Brasenose College, Oxford. An off-spin bowler, he played one match in 1956 and a full season in 1957. His best first-class figures were 4 for 42 against D. R. Jardine’s XI in 1957.

After graduating from Oxford he went to Canada, where he played several matches of non-first-class cricket for the national team.

References

External links
 
 Robert Wilson at CricketArchive

1934 births
Living people
People educated at Warwick School
Alumni of Brasenose College, Oxford
English cricketers
Oxford University cricketers
Free Foresters cricketers
Cricketers from Worcestershire